Robert B. and Vitae A. Kite Apartment Building is a historic apartment building located at Springfield, Greene County, Missouri. It was built about 1906, and is a small-scale two-story brick apartment building, with a symmetrical square plan.  It houses four apartment units on the first and second floors in a two-over-two configuration.  It features a two-story stacked wood porch characteristic of the Porched Square Apartment.

It was listed on the National Register of Historic Places in 2004.

References

Residential buildings on the National Register of Historic Places in Missouri
Residential buildings completed in 1906
Buildings and structures in Springfield, Missouri
National Register of Historic Places in Greene County, Missouri
1906 establishments in Missouri